Ectoedemia hispanica is a moth of the family Nepticulidae. It is endemic to eastern and southern Spain.

The wingspan is 6.2-6.8 mm. Adults have been caught in July.

Unlike most other Nepticulidae species, the larvae mine the bark of their host, rather than the leaves. The hostplant is unknown, although the type location has Castanea species and Quercus suber present.

External links
Fauna Europaea
A Taxonomic Revision Of The Western Palaearctic Species Of The Subgenera Zimmermannia Hering And Ectoedemia Busck s.str. (Lepidoptera, Nepticulidae), With Notes On Their Phylogeny

Nepticulidae
Moths of Europe
Moths described in 1985